is a manga series written and illustrated by Mihona Fujii. It was published by Shueisha and serialized in Ribon shōjo manga magazine from 1998 to 2002. The manga was also published in the U.S. by CMX. In 2019, Mihona Fujii announced that the series will continue from November 5 on Shueisha's Manga Mee app, taking off from the manga's ending.

An anime television series adaptation produced by Studio Pierrot titled  aired in Japan on TV Tokyo between April 1, 2001 and March 31, 2002, running a length of 52 episodes. The first 26 episodes had been licensed and dubbed for North American distribution by ADV Films under the name Super Gals! and was distributed on DVD from 2003 to 2004. The Right Stuf International announced at Anime Expo 2006 that they had licensed all the episodes, including 27-52 and released a subtitled boxset containing the remaining 26 episodes on January 16, 2007. A box set containing all 52 episodes was also released in 2010.

Plot
The series revolves around the kogal (generally known as gyaru, or "gal") subculture in Japan. The title character, Ran Kotobuki is the self-proclaimed "world's greatest gal." As a teenager in Shibuya, she is determined to live out the gal lifestyle for the rest of her life, and she has gained a reputation as the most respected gal in all of Shibuya. However, she comes from a family of police officers—her grandparents, her parents, and her older brother are all officers, and her younger sister is set on following in their footsteps. Ran has other dreams for her future, but as frequently shown, she has acquired the family's sense of justice and spirit. Her two friends, Miyu and Aya, also have their own problems and circumstances.

The sequel manga follows the original manga's ending storyline. Ran, Miyu, Aya, and their friends still hangout in Shibuya after they graduate. Ran is still deciding her career, Miyu is now part of Kotobuki family after she marries Yamato. Miyu decides to search for her missing mother along with her friends, Yamato and his family so she can tell her that Miyu will always love her and showing her new life. Aya is now a university student alongside Rei as they attend the same campus.

Characters
The first nine volumes of the CMX translation have the family name first.

Main

Ran Kotobuki is a strong-willed, athletic, and attractive gal with orange hair with a red streak who rules the streets of Shibuya. Although she comes from a long line of police officers, she is ditzy and absent-minded when it comes to school and the only subject she gets good grades on is physical education and her poorest subjects are mathematics and literature. When she was in elementary school, she was enthusiastic about becoming a police officer, but quit the ambition after learning that she won't be able to dye her hair or wear her favorite accessories. She is usually obsessed with anything that is trendy or catches her eye, usually brown-nosing guys who find her cute to buy them, and is also quite gluttonous. But inside her heart, she has a strong sense of justice that runs in her blood and is extremely intimidating and tough when she's in combat mode. She is a role model to the junior students at Hounan High for her social status as a magnificent gal for justice and her very understanding nature for teens who are learning to cope, but some look upon her with jealousy and anger. Despite being an underachiever, Ran is smart and has a good memory on what she is interested in (such as shopping). There is a running gag in the manga that some of her friends say that if only she used that (memory, concentration, etc.) on studying, she'd get somewhere in life. She also has a foreign friend, Vivian Lin, a Taiwanese celebrity who looks amazingly like her, whom she met during a school trip to Taiwan (only shown in two stories of the manga). Ran wishes that she has soft hair, but according to Rui Otahata, Rei Otohata's cousin, her hair is damaged and dry due to the amount of bleach she pours on it. Her favorite color of her silhouette is red.

Miyu is an independent, headstrong, and kind-hearted classmate with blonde hair with an orange ombre of Ran and one of her closest friends. However, behind her romantic and cute cover lies a dark past. When she was in third grade, her parents divorced (her father is currently remarried) and she lived with her mother, who paid more attention to looking for a new man rather than to see Miyu grow up (she despised Miyu because she reminded her of her divorced husband). She once was the leader of a street gang called the "Resistance", often wreaking mayhem and irritation during middle school and had a rough-mannered and threatening personality that Ran despised. One day, Yamato (by then a rookie cop) saved her from a tough situation, and his dedication to helping with Miyu's problems made her fall in love with him. Because of that, she left the life of crime and became more polite after Yamato told her his wish for her to be good and eventually became great friends with Ran. However, she remains an incredible fighter and can get back to her previous violent self when someone completely upsets her and when she becomes uncharacteristically furious. In conversation, she has a habit of referring to herself in the third person, though occasionally uses first person in more serious situations. Ran often remarks how Miyu is "lovey-dovey" with Yamato and there is a running gag on both series when they are interrupted when they are trying to kiss, usually by Ran. When her mom eventually moved out, she moved into a new apartment and married Yamato in Hawaii in the manga. Her favorite color of her silhouette is yellow.

Aya is one of the top students with black hair in Ran's class, but she was secretly doing enjo kōsai to earn money according to the first chapter/episode, since her parents were very strict about her being in number one in academics and wouldn't let her do any part-time jobs or go out. Ran found out and confronted her about it, fortunately making her realize that she was doing the wrong thing before Aya could actually "do it" with somebody. Since then, Aya became good friends with Ran and Miyu. She is a shy but honest and studious individual who enjoys academics while also longing for excitement every now and then, which is thankfully provided by Ran. Aya strengthens and changes during course of the series. She's usually a crybaby when it comes to sad or happy moments, but she grows braver and learns to stand on her own. She has deep feelings for Rei Otohata but her shyness leads to complications in their relationship, especially as Otohata initially dates her due to pity rather than affection, but the two eventually manage to establish a genuine relationship by the end of the series. Her favorite color of her silhouette is blue.

Rei Otohata is a student at Meisho Daichi High School (Champion High School in ADV's dub). He is also known as "#1", because he was featured in a magazine as being the coolest and most handsome teenage guy in the area. He rides a motorcycle and is good friends with Yuya. He has a cold and detached demeanor, and is constantly annoyed by Ran. He has trouble expressing his feelings towards others. He initially likes Ran but tends to hide this well, but later reciprocate Aya's feelings for him by the end of the series.

Yuya is also a student at Meisho Daichi High School, and he is known as "#2" or "Second Place", as he was the runner-up to Rei in a popularity magazine poll. He and Rei are friends. Early in the series, he develops a crush on Ran, even role-playing how it would be nice to date her, but Ran is oblivious to the fact. The crush gets worse when Tatsuki joins in and confesses successfully to Ran. As time passes, he helps Mami Honda out to the point that Mami starts falling for him, even though he still has a crush on Ran. Near the end of the series, he gets over Ran, and ends up dating Mami.

Tatsuki Kuroi (also nicknamed Tatsukichi) is a wild and kind student at Machida West High School, and he calls himself "the parapara king of Machida" (also known as "Machida Black", since the "kuro" in his last name means "black"). In the manga he is also called Blackwell (the literal translation of his surname). He is often nicknamed "Monkey Boy" since his personality is very similar to that of a monkey. He becomes Ran's boyfriend, although she studiously avoids anything remotely approaching intimacy other than hugging or holding hands, thus calming him. He likes to use English words and phrases in his conversations. Sometimes he says a phrase in English then he will say then same phrase in Japanese, or he will say a phrase beginning in Japanese and ending in English, and then he will say the same phrase again, switching the Japanese and English parts (example: "Black nichiyōbi", "Black Sunday", and then "Kuroi Sunday"). He also likes to call Yuya "brother" in English.

Supporting

Ran's and Sayo's older brother. Unlike Ran, he has a sensitive and passionate personality that shows through his job as a cop, and is usually on duty at the Shibuya "koban". The only thing that annoys him is when Ran causes trouble in Shibuya and he has to bring her to the police station. His love interest is Ran's best friend, the much-younger Miyu Yamazaki, whom he first met when he was a rookie cop and when Miyu was a troublesome and violent gangster. It was he that helped her to be good, since he was the only one who believed in her. In the end, he helped Miyu move into her new apartment and married her after she finished high school.

Ran's and Yamato's younger sister. She dreams of being a detective like her father has. Sayo and her boyfriend, Masato Iwai, often roleplay as conspicuous detectives, drawing the attention of onlookers and inciting frustration from Ran who is bothered by their antics. She is very energetic and enthusiastic about everything she does - however, she is slightly accident prone and often falls face down when she tries to run away or exit in a dramatic fashion. She ends her sentences with the phrase . In the end of the series she is still with Masato and they both go the same high school that Ran goes to.

Ran's father is the local Chief of Detectives. He disapproves of his daughter's lifestyle. He tries his best to make Ran say that she wants to be a police officer, and often tries various tactics to get her to do various jobs helping the people (like refusing to giving her money). He is also famous for employing a technique called "Taizo's Giant Swing of Fury" on Ran when he loses patience with her and once on Sayo.

Ran's mother who is also a police officer. It is a running gag throughout the series about her mysterious age, as she appears to be much younger than her husband. She is much more patient with Ran and the entire family in general- she never seems upset by Ran's choice to be a Gal as is very supportive of her children. Towards the end of the manga, she tells Miyu that she considers Miyu her daughter, showing just how nurturing she can be.

Mami is a gal from the neighboring Ikebukuro district where she is known as the "Queen of Ikebukuro". She has a fierce rivalry with Ran and participates in several competitions with her. She develops feelings for Yuya after he comforts her during some of the matches. She later forms a truce with Ran. In the anime, she comes from a very rich family.

Harue is Mami's best friend. She was once a member of a gang called the "Eagles", which was broken up by Miyu's "Resistance" gang. She once sent in a nasty email to everyone in school about Miyu and her past.

Masato is Sayo's boyfriend since the beginning of junior high. He fell in love with her as "the cute girl who always wore a hat" (which she only wore because she cut her bangs too short). From then on, they were a steady couple. He's a bit fun-loving and kind of weird like Sayo and imitates as a junior cop with her, but very just and gallant, especially to Sayo. At the end of the series, he goes to the same high school as Sayo, and they are still a couple.

Naoki Kuroi is Tatsuki's little brother. He's a street-smart, outgoing, but good-hearted boy who, like his brother, thinks of himself as a ladies man, but ends up having crushes on every girl he meets, including Ran, Miyu, Aya, Sayo, and, at the end of the TV series, he has a crush on Kasumi. He enjoys riding a skateboard. He works at their father's ramen shop every now and then, and someday wants to run the business. At first Naoki is upset that Tatsuki does not want to take over the family business, but Tatsuki tells Naoki that he wants to do what he wants.

Ran's teacher. He is very annoyed whenever Ran arrives late or comes up with a pathetic excuse for not having her homework. He is called "Naka-Teach" by Ran. Nakanishi tries to help Ran to do better in school by making her go to his after school classes and always has to scold her.
 and 
Satsuki 
Rie 
Satsuki and Rie are Ran's schoolmates since elementary school. Satsuki has blonde hair in a short ponytail, and Rie has black hair.

Red 
Yellow 
Blue 
The three ganguro girls who enjoy bugging Ran. They are identified by the colors red, yellow, blue. They spend much of their time in "sun-salos".

Kazuki is a boy who befriends Aya. He acts nice to Aya but disapproves Aya hanging around non-academic friends. He becomes angry at Rei for the way he treats Aya, and confesses to Aya.

Anime-only

A country girl who wants to be Ran's disciple.

Kasumi is a glasses girl whose dream is to be the number one gal in Shibuya and overthrow Ran. Her reasons for becoming a gal is because, when she was younger, she was picked on by some guys. A gal (who appears to have been Towa) saves her from being bullied. Her and Ran have a strong rivalry and she tries her hardest to do something that would cause Ran to lose her title as number 1. This usually involves using a disguise. However all of her plans against Ran usually fail, and either she says who she is, or Ran and her friends figure out her disguise. She also finds out Ran's secret from Towa, although it's never revealed what Ran's secret is. She also has a strong sense of right, when needed. When her and Ran where trying to save up enough money to buy a jacket that each of them want badly. Kasumi sells items at a flea market in order to raise money, but when a boy wants a refund for a toy that does not work, she gives back the money to the boy. In the end she goes to the same High School as Ran, and Naoki falls for her when she tells him not to cry.

Towa is a young woman who runs the Palm Tree Cafe. She is friends with Yamato and the actor who plays Detective Kudoh. She has known Ran since Ran was just a little girl, and they used to play together. Towa was one of the first gals in Shibuya, and was the number one gal back in the day, before Towa passed the title to Ran. She overreacts at times, and when Ran upsets her, she says that she will tell her friends her secret (which is never revealed). She also has a black belt in Karate, and is also kind hearted. When Miyu needs a place to stay, she lives in the empty room at the Palm Tree Cafe. At the end of the series she gives the manager job to the actor who plays "Detective Kudoh", as she quits her job.
 and 
Minigal Tan 
Minigal White 
These chibi gals introduce the various gal-terminology throughout the series.

Chapters
Original

Reprint

Theme songs
Opening

Lyricist: Kana / Composer: Kana / Arranger: Akio Noyama / Singers: dicot

Ending

Lyricist: Ikuno Takagi / Composer: Isao Yoshida / Arranger: Isao Yoshida / Singers: Jungle Smile

Episode list
Episodes are numbered as streets, such as "1st street", "2nd street", and so forth. They are also stylized with heart symbols and right arrows. the English titles are generally from the RightStuf version.

Season 1

Season 2: The Heart of Shibuya
In North America, the episodes were not dubbed into English, but were presented as Japanese with English subtitles.

Video games
Three video games have been created by Konami. The first video game has the same title as the anime and was released on July 26, 2001. The second video game was titled  and was released on February 7, 2002. The third video game was titled  and was released on August 8, 2002.

Other appearances
Several Gals! character make their appearances outside their series in Kochira Katsushika-ku Kameari Kōen-mae Hashutsujo crossover manga named Shin Kochikame

Reception
T.H.E.M. Anime reviews gave the anime series five stars out of five, calling it one of the "most bright, well-animated titles to come out of fiscally-challenged Pierrot in quite some time". Chris Beveridge gave the complete DVD set an overall positive review, saying it is "ten discs of excellent anime at a fantastic price point that needs to be seen, enjoyed and treasured". Erin Finnegan of Anime News Network recommended the series to anyone who is a fan of hyperactivity or Shibuya street culture. Bamboo Dong of Anime News Network gave the anime the complete DVD set an A for the Japanese voice acting, a B+ for the English voice acting, a B+ for story, a C for Animation, an A− for art and a B for music.

See also
Para Para, a dance often seen in this series, is a type of dancing where the dancers perform preset movements, usually unique to the song.

References

Further reading

External links
Official Pierrot Webpage 
Official TV Tokyo webpage 
Official Konami website 
Official Konami website 2 
Official Konami website 3 
Official Studio Pierrot website  
Official Right Stuf webpage 
Official Enoki Films webpage 

1998 manga
2001 Japanese television series debuts
2001 anime television series debuts
2001 video games
2002 Japanese television series endings
2002 video games
ADV Films
Comedy anime and manga
CMX (comics) titles
Falling block puzzle games
Game Boy Color games
Gyaru in fiction
Japanese high school television series
Konami games
Pierrot (company)
PlayStation (console) games
School life in anime and manga
Shueisha franchises
Shueisha manga
Shōjo manga
TV Tokyo original programming